State Highway 30 (SH 30) is a State Highway in Kerala, India that starts in Thalassery and ends at the state boundary.

The Route Map 
Thalassery - NH 17 - Eranholi - Kadirur - Kuthuparamba - Nirmalagiri - Mattannur - Iritty - Vilamana - Koottupuzha - passing the State Boundary reaches SH 91 in Karnataka.

See also 
Roads in Kerala
List of State Highways in Kerala

References 

State Highways in Kerala
Roads in Kannur district